The Sagittarius Prize was a literary award given between 1991 and 2005 by the Society of Authors for a first novel by an author over the age of sixty. Initially the prize was worth £2,000 but was increased to £4,000 in 2003.

Past winners
1991 - Judith Hubback, The Sea Has Many Voices
1992 - Hugh Leonard, Parnell And The English Woman
1993 - Brian O'Doherty, The Strange Case Of Mademoiselle P.
1994 - George Hummer, Red Branch
1995 - Fred Plisner, Gravity Is Getting Me Down
1996 - Samuel Lock, As Luck Would Have It
1997 - Barbara Hardy, London Lovers
1998 - A. Sivanandan, When Memory Dies
1999 - Ingrid Mann, The Danube Testament
2000 - David Crackanthorpe, Stolen Marches
2001 - Michael Richardson, The Pig Bin
2002 - Zvi Jagendorf, Wolfy And The Strudelbakers
2003 - Margaret Kaine, Ring Of Clay
2004 - William Newton, The Two Pound Tram
2005 - Lauro Martines, Loredana

References
Sagittarius Prize@Everything2.com

First book awards
Awards established in 1991
1991 establishments in the United Kingdom
Awards disestablished in 2005
2005 disestablishments in the United Kingdom
Awards by age of recipient
British fiction awards
Society of Authors awards